Aaron Rhyne is an American video and projection designer for live theater. He is best known for his designs in the Broadway productions of Anastasia, A Gentleman's Guide to Love and Murder, and Bonnie and Clyde, as well as The Ghosts of Versailles at LA Opera. He won a Drama Desk Award for Outstanding Projection Design in 2014 and 2017.

He designed large-scale musicals for Disney including Frozen Live at the Hyperion, Tangled The Musical, and Frozen - A Musical Spectacular. Additionally he teaches projection design at his alma mater, Fordham University.

Work

Broadway 
 Anastasia
 A Gentleman's Guide to Love and Murder
 Bonnie and Clyde

Off Broadway 
 The Absolute Brightness of Leonard Pelkey, Westside Theatre
 Bootycandy, Playwrights Horizons
 Appropriate, Signature Theatre Company
 Water By The Spoonful, Second Stage Theatre
 Working, 59E59
 Wild With Happy, The Public
 Graceland, Lincoln Center Theatre
 Spirit Control, Manhattan Theatre Club
 The Lily's Revenge, HERE Arts Center

Regional, Opera, Dance, International 
 The Ghosts Of Versailles, LA Opera
 Jerry Springer: The Opera, Carnegie Hall, Sydney Opera House
 Aubergine, Berkley Repertory Theatre
 The Power of Duff, Geffen Playhouse, Huntington Theatre Company
 The Sun Also Rises, Washington Ballet
 Frozen - Live at the Hyperion, Disney California Adventure, Disneyland Resort
 La Traviata, Wolftrap
 Working, The Old Globe, Asolo Repertory Theatre
 Florencia En El Amazonas, Opera Colorado, Utah Opera
 Vices, Theatre Aspen
 The Civil War, Ford's Theatre
 Strange Interlude, Shakespeare Theatre
 Pericles, Chicago Shakespeare Theatre
 Violet, Ford's Theatre

Awards and honors 
 2010 Hewes Award (nomination) for The Lily's Revenge, HERE Arts Center
 2011 Denver Ovation Award (nomination) for Vices, Theatre Aspen
 2013 Drama Desk Award for Outstanding Projection Design (nomination) for Wild With Happy, The Public Theatre
 2014 Craig Noel Award (nomination)  for A Gentleman's Guide to Love and Murder, The Old Globe
 2014 Drama Desk Award for Outstanding Projection Design for A Gentleman's Guide to Love and Murder, Walter Kerr Theatre
 2015 Jeff Award (nomination) for Pericles, Chicago Shakespeare Theater
 2016 Connecticut Critics Circle Award for Anastasia, Hartford Stage
 2017 Drama Desk Award for Outstanding Projection Design for Anastasia, Hartford Stage
 2017 Outer Critics Circle Award for Outstanding Projection Design for Anastasia.

References

External links 
 Official Website
 

Broadway projection and video designers
Opera designers
Fordham University alumni
Fordham University faculty
Theatre designers
American scenic designers
Living people
Year of birth missing (living people)